Grinkiškis (Grinkishok) is a town in the Radviliškis District Municipality in Šiauliai County, Lithuania. It is situated on the Šušvė River. It is the seat of an eldership. According to the 2011 census, the town had population of 678.

The town was first mentioned in 1454 and soon became property of the Gatavičius family. Krzysztof Gatavičius, thankful for his military achievements, built a church in 1618. The present church was built in 1875.

In 1999, coat of arms of Grinkiškis were approved by a presidential decree. The coat of arms depict a golden angel on one knee, who holds a silver lily with three blooms. The angel was borrowed from one of the two surviving crosses in town's cemetery, made by 19th-century dievdirbys Vincas Svirskis. The lily, a symbol of purity and innocence, represents Blessed Virgin Mary – patron of the town and namesake of its church.

References

Towns in Lithuania
Towns in Šiauliai County
Kovensky Uyezd
Radviliškis District Municipality